Marzuki is an Indonesian name.

Notable people with this name include:

Surname
 Ismail Marzuki (1914–1958), Indonesian musician
 Mohammad Laica Marzuki (born 1951), Indonesian judge
 Nur Amirul Fakhruddin Marzuki (born 1992), Malaysian cyclist
 Ghazali bin Marzuki, Singaporean murder victim of the Toa Payoh child murders in 1981

Given name
 Marzuki Alie (born 1955), Indonesian politician
 Marzuki Badriawan (born 1967), Indonesian footballer
 Marzuki Darusman (born 1945), Indonesian politician
 Marzuki Elias, Singaporean footballer
 Marzuki Usman (born 1943), Indonesian economist

See also
 Marzuki (band), American indie band

References